Qeshlaq-e Hajj Hashem-e Neysar (also Romanized as Qeshlāq-e Ḩājj Hāshem-e Neyşar; also known as Qeshlāq-e Ḩājjī Hāshem and Qeshlāq-e Ḩājjī Hāshem-e Naşīr) is a village in Qeshlaq-e Sharqi Rural District, Qeshlaq Dasht District, Bileh Savar County, Ardabil Province, Iran. At the 2006 census, its population was 29, in 8 families.

References 

Towns and villages in Bileh Savar County